Tú y Yo is the fifth studio album of Spanish singer David Bisbal. It was released on March 18, 2014.

Track listing
"No Amanece" (3:15)
"Sí Pero No" (feat. string arrangements by David Campbell) (3:47)
"Diez Mil Maneras" (3:33)
"Si Aún Te Quieres Quedar" (feat. string arrangements by David Campbell) (4:18)
"Tú y Yo" (3:49)
"Mi Estrella de Cine" (3:15)
"Culpable" (Written by Mario Cardoso and Bisbal) (feat. string arrangements by David Campbell) (3:51)
"Hombre de tu Vida" (feat. Sandy) (3:29)
"Burbuja" (feat. string arrangements by David Campbell) (3:56)
"Lo Que Vendrá" (feat. Antonio Orozco) (3:16)
"Olvidé Respirar" (feat. India Martínez) (4:22)
"Vida, Qué Locura" (3:41)
"Para Enamorarte de Mí" (3:54) (Bonus)
"Mama (Ojos Mágicos)" (4:22) (Bonus)
"Historia de un Amor" (feat. Marco Antonio Solís) (3:34) (Bonus)
"Fuego de Noche, Nieve de Día" (feat. Paty Cantú) (3:30)
"Hoy" (3:02) – Tour Edition
"Lo Que Vendrá – Solo Version" (3:16) – Tour Edition
"Hombre de tu vida – Spanish Version" (feat. Sandy) (3:28) – Tour Edition
"Lo Que Vivimos" (3:30) – Tour Edition & iTunes
"Si Aún Te Quieres Quedar" (Feat. Cuca Roseta) (3:19) – Gold Edition
"Hombre de tu vida – italo/spanish version" (Feat. Emma Marrone) (3:29) – Gold Edition
"Ámame – Amami spanish Version" (Feat. Emma Marrone) (3:50) – Gold Edition & iTunes Italy
"Unbreakable (Diez Mil Maneras)" (3:29) – Gold Edition
"Unbreakable (Diez Mil Maneras) – Club Remix" (5:28) – Gold Edition
"Closer Tonight (Freixenet 2014)" (2:00) – Gold Edition
"Closer Tonight – FBT Remix" (3:37) – Gold Edition

Charts

Weekly charts

Year-end charts

Certifications

References 

2014 albums
David Bisbal albums
Spanish-language albums